Eliachna hemicordata is a species of moth of the family Tortricidae. It is found in Argentina (Neuquén, Río Negro) and Chile (Malleco, Bio Bio and Cautín).

The ground colour of the forewings is pale orange-cream with tiny black specks. The hindwings are pale grey brown with darker mottling. Adults have been recorded on wing from December to February.

Etymology
The species name refers to the half-hearted shape of the distal portion of the valva.

References

Moths described in 2002
Endemic fauna of Argentina
Tortricidae of South America
Euliini
Moths of South America